Eupithecia inturbata, the maple pug,  is a moth of the family Geometridae. The species can be found in central Europe, Great Britain and southern Scandinavia.

The wingspan is 13–15 mm. The moths flies from July to August depending on the location.

The caterpillars feed on Acer campestris.

References

External links

Maple pug on UKmoths
Lepiforum.de

Moths described in 1817
inturbata
Moths of Europe
Taxa named by Jacob Hübner